The Carnegie Hall Concert: June 18, 1971 was Carole King's first concert performance in front of an audience.

Performed on June 18, 1971, it was released years later, in 1996, as an album. This album has seventeen live songs. Some songs included: "Will You Love Me Tomorrow?", "You've Got a Friend", "Child of Mine", "I Feel the Earth Move", "It's Too Late", "Beautiful", "(You Make Me Feel Like) A Natural Woman", "After All This Time", "Carry Your Load", "Song of Long Ago" and "Home Again".

James Taylor, a friend of King, accompanied her on "Will You Love Me Tomorrow?", "Up on the Roof", and "You've Got a Friend". Before she started singing, an old saying went into her mind, "How did the man get to Carnegie Hall?" Out loud she said the answer "Practice man, practice!" Then she performed.

Track listing
All songs written and composed by Carole King, except where noted

"I Feel the Earth Move" – 3:36
"Home Again" – 2:45
"After All This Time" – 3:19
"Child of Mine" (Gerry Goffin, King)  – 4:03
"Carry Your Load" – 2:59
"No Easy Way Down" – (Goffin, King) 5:32
"Song of Long Ago" – 3:24
"Snow Queen" (Goffin, King) – 3:51
"Smackwater Jack" (Goffin, King) – 3:49
"So Far Away" – 4:12
"It's Too Late" (King, Toni Stern) – 4:22
"Eventually" (Goffin, King) – 4:38
"Way Over Yonder" – 4:13
"Beautiful"  – 2:39
"You've Got a Friend" [Performed with James Taylor] – 6:25
"Will You Still Love Me Tomorrow?" / "Some Kind of Wonderful" / "Up on the Roof" [medley; performed with James Taylor] (Goffin, King) – 7:46
"(You Make Me Feel Like) A Natural Woman" (Goffin, King, Jerry Wexler) – 4:09

Personnel
Carole King – piano, vocals
Danny Kortchmar – guitar
Charles Larkey – bass
David Campbell etc. – strings (uncredited)
James Taylor – vocals on "You've Got a Friend" and "Will You Still Love Me Tomorrow?"/"Some Kind of Wonderful"/"Up on the Roof"

Production
Lou Adler – Producer
Hank Cicalo – Engineer
Howard Frank – Project Coordinator for Ode Records
Ode Sound & Visuals – Art Direction & Photography
Dave Burle – Art Director
Stephen K. Peeples – Liner Notes
Jim McCrary – Photography

Albums produced by Lou Adler
Carole King live albums
1996 live albums
Albums recorded at Carnegie Hall
Epic Records live albums
Legacy Recordings live albums